Baner Hill is a hill that separates two suburbs of Pashan and Baner in the city of Pune. The hill is the third highest point within the city limits, with an elevation of 2224 ft., surpassed by the Vetal Hill. There is a temple located in the northern foot of the hill. One can view the whole of baner on one side and the pashan area from the other. The place is home for plantation drive that has been taken up enthusiastically by the locals, helped by numerous volunteers. It has also a trail that runs along the park on the West and East sides using the various transverses to cut across the park.

Location

Baner hill is surrounded by two suburbs of Pune, Pashan and Baner. Most of its area is in Baner, so it is commonly known as Baner Hill. The hillock runs East-West. It has a spur which is locally known as the Pashan Hill which has an elevation of 2100 ft.

Climate

The temperature here is 1 to 2 degrees cooler than the temperature in the main city. Rest of the area shares almost same climatic conditions as that of Pune.

Trekking
Baner hill is famous for trekking in people nearby. There are 4 routes which are accessible. They are as follows:
 Route 1 - From Balewadi
 Route 2 - From Pashan-Baner Link Road
 Route 3 - From NH4 Bypass (Via Pashan Hill)
 Route 4 - From Lokseva School
 Route 5 - From Aundh-Baner link road
 Route 6 - From Sangavi

Hills of Pune